"Live Fast, Die Young" is the third single by American rapper Rick Ross from his fourth studio album Teflon Don (2010). It features Kanye West, who also stood as the sole producer. The song samples three tracks in its composition. A music video was announced by Ross, but never saw an official release.

Background
The song leaked online on July 1, 2010, twelve days before being released as a single. On July 21, Ross announced that the music video would be directed by Hype Williams, but the video was never officially released. The song was supposed to be a solo Kanye West song called "Hard Horn Nightmare" meant for his album "Good Ass Job", which became his November 2010 release "My Beautiful Dark Twisted Fantasy".

Composition
The track samples a total of three songs. The songs sampled are: "If This World Were Mine" by The Bar-Kays, "Uphill Peace Of Mind" by Kid Dynamite and "Funky President (People It's Bad)" by James Brown. It was viewed by Phil Miter of Noisey Vice as being among West's 2010 productions that: 'depict unreal wealth and power in the process of decay, melting into unrecognizable, disturbing shapes'.

Commercial performance
"Live Fast, Die Young" debuted at number 89 on the US Billboard on the week of its release as a single.

Charts

Release history

References

2010 singles
2010 songs
Kanye West songs
Maybach Music Group singles
Music videos directed by Hype Williams
Rick Ross songs
Song recordings produced by Kanye West
Songs written by Frederick Knight (singer)
Songs written by Kanye West
Songs written by Marvin Gaye
Songs written by Rick Ross